Clay Clement (May 19, 1888 – October 20, 1956) was an American stage, film, and TV actor. He appeared in more than 80 films between 1918 and 1947. Clement was one of the earliest members of the Screen Actors Guild. He was born in Lebanon, Ohio and died in Watertown, New York.

Selected filmography

 Stolen Honor (1918) - Robert Macklin
 The Purple Lily (1918) - Frank Farnsworth
 The Heart of a Girl (1918) - J. Drake
 The Power and the Glory (1918) - Shade Buckheath
 Appearance of Evil (1918) - Charlie Royce
 The Sea Waif (1918) - Silas Jones
 Forest Rivals (1919) - Jean Dubois
 The Steel King (1919) - Arthur Whipple
 Hollywood Speaks (1932) - (uncredited)
 False Faces (1932) - Dr. Kelly (uncredited)
 Washington Merry-Go-Round (1932) - Samuel D. Marcus - Producer (uncredited)
 Evenings for Sale (1932) - Von Trask
 Manhattan Tower (1932) - Kenneth Burns
 Rasputin and the Empress (1932) - Minor Role (uncredited)
 Lawyer Man (1932) - Tony's Friend (uncredited)
 Second Hand Wife (1933) - Peter Cavendish
 The Past of Mary Holmes (1933) - G.K. Ethridge
 Tonight Is Ours (1933) - Seminoff
 Hard to Handle (1933) - Federal Man #1 (uncredited)
 The Circus Queen Murder (1933) - Lubbell (uncredited)
 The Working Man (1933) - Atkinson - Hartland Co. Man (uncredited)
 The Kiss Before the Mirror (1933) - Reporter at Trial (uncredited)
 Hold Me Tight (1933) - Blair
 The Nuisance (1933) - Judge (uncredited)
 The Silk Express (1933) - Myton Associate (uncredited)
 Don't Bet on Love (1933) - Arnold Ross, Attorney at Law (uncredited)
 Bureau of Missing Persons (1933) - Burton C. Kingman
 The World Changes (1933) - Lt. Col. George Armstrong Custer
 Son of a Sailor (1933) - Blanding (uncredited)
 Advice to the Lovelorn (1933) - Joseph C. Douglas - District Attorney (uncredited)
 Wonder Bar (1934) - Businessman (uncredited)
 Journal of a Crime (1934) - Inspector
 House of Mystery (1934) - John Prendergast aka John Pren
 Upper World (1934) - Medical Examiner (uncredited)
 Let's Be Ritzy (1934) - Mr. Hildreth
 The Thin Man (1934) - Quinn (uncredited)
 The Personality Kid (1934) - Duncan
 Now I'll Tell (1934) - Fight Fan (uncredited)
 Madame Du Barry (1934) - Nobleman at Duc de Choiseul's Meeting (uncredited)
 Side Streets (1934) - Jack
 Friends of Mr. Sweeney (1934) - Charles Cramer (uncredited)
 I Sell Anything (1934) - Peter Van Gruen
 The St. Louis Kid (1934) - Man with Gun at Flora's (uncredited)
 I Am a Thief (1934) - Man at Hoyle's Meeting (uncredited)
 Murder in the Clouds (1934) - Flight Commander
 Sweet Music (1935) - Mr. Johnson
 Dinky (1935) - Gerald Standish
 Chinatown Squad (1935) - Earl Raybold
 Don't Bet on Blondes (1935) - T. Everett Markham
 Woman Wanted (1935) - Smiley's Henchman (uncredited)
 Streamline Express (1935) - John Bradley
 Confidential (1935) - Insp. Arthur M. Preston
 Whipsaw (1935) - Harry Ames
 Hitch Hike Lady (1935) - Warden
 Two Against the World (1936) - Mr. Banning
 The Leavenworth Case (1936) - Inspector Holmes
 It Had to Happen (1936) - McCloskey - Scaffa's Attorney (uncredited)
 The Leathernecks Have Landed (1936) - Capt. Halstead
 Wife vs. Secretary (1936) - Herbert 'Herb' (uncredited)
 The Great Ziegfeld (1936) - Jack - Barber Shop Customer (uncredited)
 The First Baby (1936) - Obstetrician (uncredited)
 Let's Sing Again (1936) - Jackson
 The Three Wise Guys (1936) - Manager of Magnin's (uncredited)
 Hearts in Bondage (1936) - Lt. Worden
 Nobody's Fool (1936) - Fixer Belmore
 Bad Guy (1937) - Bronson
 Rosalie (1937) - Captain Banner
 Arson Gang Busters (1938) - Hamilton
 A Trip to Paris (1938) - Duroche
 Numbered Woman (1938)
 Straight Place and Show (1938) - Carter (uncredited)
 King of Alcatraz (1938) - Fred Cateny (uncredited)
 Disbarred (1939) - Attorney Roberts
 Off the Record (1939) - Jaeggers
 Star Reporter (1939) - Whittaker
 Society Smugglers (1939) - Anthony Harrison
 Each Dawn I Die (1939) - Stacey's Attorney
 Girl from Rio (1939) - 'Mitch' Mitchell
 The Roaring Twenties (1939) - Bramfield, the Broker (uncredited)
 Allegheny Uprising (1939) - John Penn
 Parole Fixer (1940) - Stebbins (uncredited)
 Granny Get Your Gun (1940) - Riff Daggett
 Teddy, the Rough Rider (1940, Short) - Avery D. Andrews (uncredited)
 Passport to Alcatraz (1940) - Drexel Stuyvesunt
 I'm Still Alive (1940) - Roger, First Director
 Boomerang (1947) - Judge Tate (uncredited)
 Celanese Theatre  (1952, Episode: "On Borrowed Time") - Dr. Evans

References

External links

Clay Clement(Aveleyman)

1888 births
1956 deaths
American male film actors
American male silent film actors
Male actors from Kentucky
20th-century American male actors